União Futebol Comércio e Indústria de Tomar, or more commonly União de Tomar, is a Portuguese association football club formed on 4 May 1914 and based in the city of Tomar. The club spent a total of six seasons in the Portuguese Liga, Portugal's top division, and won the Portuguese Second Division in 1974. It is the only club from Santarém District to have competed in the Primeira Liga.

Appearances
Premier Division: 6
Segunda Divisão: 16
Terceira Divisão: 19
Portuguese Cup: 34
5 times in the 1/4 finals
once in the 1/8 finals
one in the 1/16 finals
11 times in the 1/32 finals

Season to season
1940–43: Segunda Divisão
1960–65: Terceira Divisão
1965–68: Segunda Divisão
1968–69: 10th (Tier 1)
1969–70: 14th (Tier 1)
1970–71: Tier 2
1971–72: 12th
1972–73: 16th
1973–74: Tier 2 (South Zone)
1974–75: 13th
1975–76: 14th
1976–80: Tier 2
1980–83: Terceira Divisão
1893-84: Segunda Divisão
1984–85: Terceira Divisão
1987–88: AF Santarém
1988–90: Terceira Divisão
1990–93: Segunda Divisão
1993–97: Terceira Divisão
1997–98: AF Santarém
1998–2002: Terceira Divisão
2002–present: AF Santarém

Managers
 1964–1966:  Di Paola
 1967–1970:  Oscar Tellechea
 1970–1972:  Fernando Cabrita
 1972–1973:  António Medeiros /  Enrique Vega
 1973–1975:  Artur Santos
 1975–1976:  Francisco Andrade

Honours

Segunda Divisão (South Zone):
 1974
Terceira Divisão:
1964/65
Série D:
1982/83
1989/90

References

External links
Official website 

 
Football clubs in Portugal
Association football clubs established in 1914
U.F.C.I. Tomar
U.F.C.I. Tomar
Primeira Liga clubs